PRBC may refer to:

Packed red blood cells
PRBC (company): a company